Ciğer kebabı (English: liver kebab) is a common type of skewered meat served in Anatolian cuisine, usually eaten with sliced onions, salad and bread.

Liver is served in different ways in Kurdish cooking, and can be found on its own as a main course in a sizzling plate, or as a kebab on shish skewers. Ciğer kebab has been registered that it belongs to the Diyarbakır. 

In Antep cuisine from the city of Gaziantep, the liver is often placed into lavaş bread with the option of adding mint, peppers and other complements. The dish is often eaten for breakfast in Diyarbakir and Gaziantep

References 

Turkish cuisine
Liver (food)